The final of UEFA Futsal Championship 2010 was a futsal match played on 30 January 2010 at the Főnix Arena in Debrecen, Hungary to determine the winner of 2010 UEFA Futsal Championship. The match was contested by Portugal and Spain, and won by Spain by 4 goals to 2 goals.

Match details

References
 Official site

Final
2010
2010 UEFA Championship Final
2010 UEFA Championship Final
2009–10 in Portuguese football
2009–10 in Spanish futsal
Portugal–Spain relations
Sport in Debrecen